Gravesia may refer to:
 Gravesia (ammonite), an extinct genus of ammonites in the family Aulacostephanidae
 Gravesia (plant), a genus of plants in the family Melastomataceae